Adrian Cuciula (born 9 May 1986) is a Romanian football player, currently under contract at Poli Iaşi.

Career
Born in Hunedoara, Cuciula began playing football as a defender in the youth sides of Liberty Salonta. He would make more than 50 appearances for the club, and had a brief spell in Italy's Serie B with Piacenza Calcio, before joining Liga I side FC Politehnica Iași.

References

1986 births
Living people
Romanian footballers
Romanian expatriate footballers
CF Liberty Oradea players
Piacenza Calcio 1919 players
FC Politehnica Iași (1945) players
CS Corvinul Hunedoara players
Liga I players
Serie B players
Expatriate footballers in Italy
Association football defenders
Sportspeople from Hunedoara